Gunhild Oline Hagestad (born 6 November 1942) is a retired Norwegian sociologist and a former assistant professor at Agder University College. Her research interests have focused on the sociology of aging.

Personal life
Hagestad was born in Birkenes on 6 November 1942, a daughter of Tønnes Hagestad and Bertha Stapnes. She was married to György Bisztray from 1966 to 1975.

Career
Hagestad studied in the United States, where she graduated with a PhD from the University of Minnesota in 1975, with the thesis Middle aged women and their children. From 1975 to 1978 she was assistant professor at the University of Chicago, and from 1978 to 1987 at the Pennsylvania State University, and finally associate professor at the Northwestern University in Chicago. She was appointed assistant professor at the University of Oslo in 1994, and at the Agder University College/University of Agder from 1997. She is a fellow of the Norwegian Academy of Science and Letters. She is now retired and not currently affiliated with an academic institution.

Honours
Hagestad received the Matilda White Riley Award in 2013. In 2015 she was awarded the honorary prize of the Norwegian Sociological Association.

Selected works
 (co-author)
 (thesis)

References

1942 births
Living people
People from Birkenes
Norwegian sociologists
Norwegian women sociologists
Norwegian expatriates in the United States
University of Minnesota alumni
University of Chicago faculty
Pennsylvania State University faculty
Northwestern University faculty
Academic staff of the University of Oslo
Academic staff of the University of Agder
Members of the Norwegian Academy of Science and Letters
Norwegian women academics